Eucosmophora dives is a moth of the family Gracillariidae. It is known from Barbados, the British Virgin Islands (Tortola), the Dominican Republic, Grenada and Puerto Rico.

The length of the forewings is 3.3–3.7 mm for males and 3.5–4 mm for females.

The larvae feed on Inga fagifolia, Inga vera and Pithecollobium unguis-cati. They mine the leaves of their host plant.

References

Acrocercopinae
Moths described in 1897